Julia Nikolayevna Soldatova (born 17 May 1981) is a Russian former competitive figure skater who competed for both Russia and Belarus. She represented Belarus at the 2002 Winter Olympics. She is the World Junior champion, the World bronze medalist, the European silver medalist, and the 1997 JGP Final champion.

Personal life
Soldatova was born on 17 May 1981 in Moscow. She studied at the Institute for Physical Culture.

Career
Soldatova began skating at the age of four. She won the 1998 World Junior title. In 2000, she finished fourth at the Russian nationals, and therefore was not selected to compete at the 2000 World Championships.

In spring 2000, Soldatova decided to compete for Belarus internationally. She withdrew from the 2001 European Championships after the short program due to a shoulder injury. In 2004, Soldatova returned briefly to compete for Russia.

Soldatova has progressed into a coaching career. One of her best student is Daniela Asanova, a competitor at the Russian novice junior nationals 2010.

Programs

Competitive highlights

References

External links

 

Belarusian female single skaters
Figure skaters from Moscow
Russian female single skaters
1981 births
Living people
Olympic figure skaters of Belarus
Figure skaters at the 2002 Winter Olympics
World Figure Skating Championships medalists
European Figure Skating Championships medalists
World Junior Figure Skating Championships medalists